Irondequoit Creek is a stream in eastern Monroe County, New York that feeds Irondequoit Bay.  It begins in rural West Bloomfield in Ontario County, flowing north into the town of Mendon in Monroe County.  Accumulating a few small tributaries, it twists eastward back into the Ontario County town of Victor, then back north into Monroe County, where it flows through the towns of Perinton and Penfield on its way to the bay.  It also skirts the edge of the combined town and village of East Rochester.

The creek is believed to lie in a valley carved out by a pre-glacial Genesee River, which at the time would have flowed into Lake Ontario where Irondequoit Bay does today.  Glacial debris caused the river to be rerouted as the glaciers retreated, leaving only the comparatively small creek (Rogers 1893).

The first settlements in the town of Penfield sprang up along the creek, as its waters were well suited to mills.  The Daisy Flour Mill, previously a restaurant, was the last of over a dozen mills that once used the creek's waters.

The creek's valley caused a problem for the engineers of the original Erie Canal, who ultimately had to build the Great Embankment aqueduct to bridge the valley near Bushnell's Basin (Fairchild 1896:134, Farley 2010, Schoff:505).

The creek is stocked annually with fish by the New York State Department of Environmental Conservation for year-round fishing.

References

Rivers of New York (state)
Rivers of Monroe County, New York
Rivers of Ontario County, New York